The Kaunas Museum for the Blind in Kaunas, Lithuania opened in 2005. It was the first museum for the blind in the Baltic States and one of the first in Eastern Europe.

The museum, located in the catacombs underneath St. Michael the Archangel Church, was created during the course of an international exchange project, "Catacombs of the 21st Century", organized by students at the Kaunas University of Technology, under the supervision of the sculptor Robertas Antinis. Students from Greece, Turkey, and Hungary also participated in the process.  The exhibits can be perceived through sound, smells, and touch.

Due to its sole reliance on the parish for access, the museum was frequently inaccessible during the late 2000s.

References

Museums in Kaunas
2005 establishments in Lithuania